Love Jones: The Music is the soundtrack to Theodore Witcher's 1997 film Love Jones. It was released on March 11, 1997, via Sony Music.

Track listing

Notes
Tracks 6, 7, 8, 12 are not featured in the film.

Personnel
Stephen Marcussen — mastering
Toby Emmerich — executive producer
Dana Sano — executive producer
Lori Silfen — executive producer
Jon McHugh — executive producer
Nick Wechsler — executive producer
Theodore Witcher — executive producer
Melodee Sutton — music coordinator
Pilar McCurry — music supervisor
Michael T. Mauldin — A&R
Samuel J. Sapp — A&R
Randy Jackson — A&R
Glen Brunman — A&R
Christine Wilson — design

Charts

Certifications

References

External links

1997 soundtrack albums
Drama film soundtracks
Albums produced by Bob Thiele
Albums produced by Lauryn Hill
Albums produced by Wyclef Jean
Albums produced by Marcus Miller
Albums produced by Randy Jackson
Albums produced by Jermaine Dupri